The Nash 600 is an automobile that was manufactured by the Nash-Kelvinator Corporation of Kenosha, Wisconsin for the 1941 through 1949 model years, after which the car was renamed the Nash Statesman. The Nash 600 was positioned in the low-priced market segment. The "600" name comes from the car's advertised ability to go  on one tank of gasoline. Introduced for the 1941 model year, the Nash 600 became the first mass-produced unibody constructed car built in the United States.

Innovations 

The Nash 600 is generally credited with being the first mass-produced American automobile that was constructed using unitized body/frame construction techniques in which the car body and the frame are welded as one unit, rather than the more traditional body-on-frame (the body is bolted to the frame method). Unitized construction allowed Nash to advertise that the car was lighter in weight, quieter, and more rigid than its competitors.

Nash's innovation also required new techniques for collision repairs. This included the development of a new portable body and frame puller tool that was quickly accepted worldwide.

This range is due to the combination of the engine's  to  fuel economy combined with the car's  fuel tank. Additional efficiency was due to its lower weight than similar cars.

Models

Pre-war
The new cars were introduced for 1941 and marketed as the Nash Ambassador 600 series in four body versions: a four-door Slipstream (fastback) sedan with no protruding lights, running boards, or door hinges; as a four-door Sedan with built-in trunk (now called notchback style), as a Coupe Brougham with full-width front and rear seats, and as a Business Coupe featuring a roomy rear deck cargo compartment. Similar to the Mobilgas Economy Run, a 1941 event sponsored jointly by the American Automobile Association (AAA) and the Gilmore Oil, a California-based petroleum company, saw the new Nash 600 deliver  on regular roads and be proclaimed a "Best in Class" winner.

The 600 had a  turning circle. The 600 featured a three-speed manual gearbox with electric overdrive and coil springs on all four wheels.

For 1942, the Ambassador 600 was one of three series of Nash cars. Styling featured a revised front with prominent chromed NASH letters incorporated into the front trim, as well as upgraded upholstery and interior trim. Although the automaker began to gear up for defense orders for the U.S. Government, it expected to produce a sizable number of economical, low-priced 600 models.

Post-war
Nash began post-World War II car production in the fall of 1945. There were few changes from the 1942 models with the exception of revised chrome trim and a projecting center section on the lower grille. Unlike the 1941-42 policy of using the "Ambassador" nameplate on all three Nash series, the 600 became simply the Nash 600 with the Ambassador nameplate reserved for the senior model.

In 1946, the "600" featured a rear seat that could be converted into a bed as an option. It was possible to sleep with the legs tucked into the trunk area.

The 1948 was the only post-war year that Nash made a 600 in the business coupe body style. This was the lowest-priced model with minimal features, lacking a back seat (to have room for samples) as well as no chrome trim, ornamentation, or comfort items such as a sun visor and door armrest.

The 1948 Nash 600 (and Ambassador Custom) bore the work of Helene Rother, Nash's new interior stylist. They featured some of the most stylish interiors in the industry. Among her contributions were upholstery and trim colors that harmonized with specific exterior colors.

Airflyte 

The 1949 Nash 600 featured a new design based on the aerodynamic Airflyte series that was developed by Nils E. Wahlberg, Nash's Vice President of Engineering. The new cars stood out among the competition, six inches (152 mm) lower than the 1948s with a rounded body with unusual enclosed fenders so that detractors dubbed them the "bathtub" Nashes. "The envelope shape was the most streamlined form on the road, a large step ahead of the vaguely similar Packard" at that time. The 600 became the economical series competing with Chevrolet, Ford, and Plymouth; while the Ambassador became the premium models and up against brands as Buick, Oldsmobile, Mercury, Chrysler, DeSoto, and Hudson.

The sedan was the only body style available in either two or four doors and there were three trim series: Super, Super Special, and Custom. The interiors were cavernous and the driver had an unusual "Uniscope" instrument pod mounted on the steering column. Optional was a new "Twin Bed" that was formed by dropping the two front seat backs to meet the rear seat. The 1949 Nash 600 series were built on a  wheelbase and carried over the previous  I6 engine, selling at lower prices than the Nash Ambassador series that now rode on a larger  wheelbase and boasted a standard  overhead-valve I6 engine with a durable 7-main bearing design.

References

External links
 Nash Car Club
 Nash Healy History
 Nash in the UK
 

Ambassador 600
Chrysler
Ambassador 600
Sedans
Coupés
Rear-wheel-drive vehicles
Full-size vehicles
Cars introduced in 1941